Cem Yılmaz (born 23 April 1973) is a Turkish actor, stand-up comedian, musician, filmmaker, screenwriter, and cartoonist. He is best known for his films G.O.R.A. (2004), A.R.O.G (2008) and Yahşi Batı (2010), and has won two Sadri Alışık awards for his roles in Organize İşler (2005) and The Magician (2006). His international films are  Russell Crowe's film "Water Diviner" and Ferzan Özpetek's film "Magnifica presenza".

Early life and education
Yılmaz was born on 23 April 1973 in Istanbul. His family is paternally from Gürün, Sivas, while maternal part of his family is of Turkish origin who immigrated from Thessaloniki, Ottoman Empire (nowadays in Greece). He went to primary school at the Mehmet Akif School. He then got enrolled in the Bahçelievler Kazım Karabekir Secondary School, and then Etiler Anadolu Tourism Vocational High School, eventually going to Boğaziçi University and finishing his studies in Tourism and Hotel Management.

Career
In 1998, he had his cinematic debut with the movie Everything's Gonna Be Great. Yilmaz achieved his greatest success by starring in and writing the big-budget sci-fi parody G.O.R.A. (2004), also directed by Ömer Faruk Sorak. Despite spending several years in production because of financial and other technical problems, G.O.R.A. became a box-office hit and, according to Rekin Teksoy, "showed that popular cinema was successful in appealing to wide audiences". He has since repeated his box office successes with a sequel to G.O.R.A called A.R.O.G., The Magician and Yahşi Batı, and has appeared in more than 10 films and worked as a voice actor in a number of motion pictures. He played in the movie "Water Diviner" of Russell Crowe.
 
Yılmaz started doing stand-up shows in the bars of Leman Kültür in the early 1990s. He has since created four stand-up specials. In addition, he has directed the Borusan Istanbul Philharmonic Orchestra twice.
 
During the course of his career, Cem Yılmaz has been the commercial face of Panasonic, Opet, Türk Telekom, Türkiye İş Bankası and Doritos, among others. The caricatures that he has drawn and the scenario of three of his movies that were released in the form of a book were well-received by fans.

He has also received a number of awards inside Turkey, including a "Best Actor Award" at the Sadri Alışık Awards and the 4th Yeşilçam Awards.

Personal life
On 10 March 2012, he married Ahu Yağtu. The couple divorced on 31 December 2013. Together they have a son named Kemal.

With 14.4 million followers on Twitter, he's also the most subscribed Turkish artist on YouTube.

Filmography

Recurring collaborators

Shows

References

External links
 
 Cem Yılmaz's official website
  Sinemalar.com Profile
Turkish Cem Yılmaz's Biography
Cem Yılmaz Kimdir?

1973 births
Living people
Turkish male film actors
Turkish male voice actors
Turkish cartoonists
Turkish stand-up comedians
Turkish male screenwriters
Male actors from Istanbul
Boğaziçi University alumni
20th-century Turkish male actors
21st-century Turkish male actors
Golden Butterfly Award winners